Nyamjang Chu, or Nyashang Chu
() is a cross-border perennial river that originates in the Shannan Prefecture of Tibet and flows into the Arunachal Pradesh state of India, joining the Tawang Chu river just before it enters Bhutan. The Nyamjang Chu valley has provided the traditional communication route between Tawang and Tibet. The valley near town of Zemithang in the Tawang district, called the Pangchen Valley, is known for its serene beauty and forms one of the wintering locations for the black-necked crane.

The China–India border in the valley has been contested between the two countries since the 1950s, resulting in a clash at Namka Chu in 1962 and a standoff at Sumdorong Chu in 1986.

Course 

Frederick Bailey and Henry Morshead, explored the region in 1913. They crossed into the valley of Nyamjang Chu from that of Nye Chu via the Hor La pass. They give the name of the village as Gyao, which appears to be an older name of Taga. The land at this elevation was only good for grazing. The shepherds lit sheep-dung fires around the campsites to protect their flocks from the wolves.

The stream of Sumdorong Chu from the left and the river of Namka Chu from the right join the river in this area. The border in this area has been disputed between India and China.

The course of the river in India is through a steep gorge lined by dense mixed forest. The valley widens near Zemithang, where it is called the Pangchen valley. The streams of Sumta Chu (from the right) and Taktsang Chu (from the left) join Nyamjang Chu in this valley.

The river flows mostly southwards in India for 40 km and joins the west-flowing Tawang Chu near Lumla. After the confluence, Tawang Chu enters Bhutan within a short distance where it merges with Kulong Chu to form the Manas River, a major tributary of Brahmaputra.

Flora and fauna 
The Zemithang valley is one of the wintering locations for the black-necked crane, a vulnerable species of which only 4,000 are believed to be alive as of 1996.

Notes

References

Bibliography

External links 
 The course of the Nyamjang Chu marked on OpenStreetMap
 Gorsam Chorten (photograph by Amar Grover), AWL Images, retrieved 10 July 2020.
 Ranju Dodum, Lax policies cause of concern for conservation, 'ranjuwrites' (blog), 13 April 2017.

Rivers of Tibet
Rivers of Arunachal Pradesh
Shannan, Tibet
Tawang district
China–India border